Dominik "Dodo" Stroh-Engel (born 27 November 1985) is a German professional footballer who plays as a forward for FC Memmingen.

Career
Stroh-Engel was born in Ehringshausen. From 2005 until December 2006 he played for Eintracht Frankfurt. In the 2005–06 season he scored half of the goals of the reserves in the Oberliga. He played well at the indoor tournaments and made his first Bundesliga match against Hannover 96 when he came on as a substitute for Alexander Meier. He made three appearances before leaving in 2007 to sign for SV Wehen Wiesbaden. After the end of the 2009–10 season his contract with Wehen Wiesbaden was cancelled, and Stroh-Engel moved to SV Babelsberg 03. He returned to Wehen two seasons later, where he remained for one season.

In July 2013, Stroh-Engel joined SV Darmstadt 98. On 14 March 2014, he set a new 3. Liga record by scoring his 23rd goal of the season against Hansa Rostock. The previous record of 22 goals was set in the 2009–10 season by Régis Dorn of SV Sandhausen. He ended the season as the division's record top scorer, with 27 goals becoming a key factor in the surprise promotion of Darmstadt 98 into the German 2. Liga.

He scored a further nine goals in the 2. Bundesliga which helped in securing promotion to the Bundesliga.

References

Living people
1985 births
People from Lahn-Dill-Kreis
Sportspeople from Giessen (region)
Association football forwards
German footballers
Eintracht Frankfurt players
Eintracht Frankfurt II players
SV Wehen Wiesbaden players
SV Wehen Wiesbaden II players
SV Babelsberg 03 players
SV Darmstadt 98 players
Karlsruher SC players
SpVgg Unterhaching players
FC Memmingen players
Bundesliga players
2. Bundesliga players
3. Liga players
Austrian Regionalliga players
Bayernliga players
German expatriate footballers
Expatriate footballers in Austria
German expatriate sportspeople in Austria